Laramarca District is one of sixteen districts of the province Huaytará in Peru. It is located in the southern part of the province next to Querco District.

References